Isetsuhiko-no-mikoto (伊勢都彦命 or 伊勢都比古命) is an obscure Japanese god of the wind who appears in both the Fudoki of Ise Province (surviving only in the form of excerpts found in other writings) and the Fudoki of Harima Province.

Myths

Isetsuhiko and Amenohiwake

Two stories about Isetsuhiko appear in the extant fragments of the Ise Fudoki. One excerpt involves his surrender of his land (what would become Ise) to Amenohiwake-no-mikoto (天日別命), who claimed it in the name of the Emperor Jimmu.

Isetsuhiko's stone fortress

A second excerpt from the Ise Fudoki relates another legend about the god and the origin of the name 'Ise'.

In the Harima Fudoki

Isetsuhiko-no-mikoto (伊勢都比古命) is also mentioned in passing in the Fudoki of Harima Province as the son of Iwa-no-ōkami (伊和大神), god of Iwa Shrine, believed to dwell in Iseno (伊勢野, part of modern Hayashida-chō, Himeji City) with his sister, Isetsuhime-no-mikoto (伊勢都比売命).

Identification with Takeminakata
Since the Edo period, a number of authors - among them the Kokugaku scholar Motoori Norinaga  - have attempted to identify Isetsuhiko with the god Takeminakata who briefly appears in the Kojiki, due to perceived parallels between the two deities.

Isetsuhiko is said to be the son of a god of Izumo Province, with his father being identified in the Harima Fudoki as Iwa-no-ōkami, a god often conflated with Ōkuninushi, Takeminakata's father in the Kojiki. In addition, he is also considered to be a god of the wind like Takeminakata.
The account of Isetsuhiko's surrender to Amenohiwake shows a thematic similarity to Takeminakata's surrender to Takemikazuchi in the Kojiki, both accounts even ending with the deity in question being sent to exile in Shinano Province. (Note, however, that the detail about Isetsuhiko being going to Shinano was an addition by a later hand.)

See also
Takeminakata
Fudoki
Ise Province

Notes

References

Japanese deities
Nature gods
Shinto kami
Wind deities
Amatsukami